Teodorów may refer to the following places in Poland:
Teodorów, Oława County in Lower Silesian Voivodeship (south-west Poland)
Teodorów, Polkowice County in Lower Silesian Voivodeship (south-west Poland)
Teodorów, Brzeziny County in Łódź Voivodeship (central Poland)
Teodorów, Łask County in Łódź Voivodeship (central Poland)
Teodorów, Gmina Będków in Łódź Voivodeship (central Poland)
Teodorów, Gmina Budziszewice in Łódź Voivodeship (central Poland)
Teodorów, Lublin Voivodeship (east Poland)
Teodorów, Świętokrzyskie Voivodeship (south-central Poland)
Teodorów, Gostynin County in Masovian Voivodeship (east-central Poland)
Teodorów, Siedlce County in Masovian Voivodeship (east-central Poland)
Teodorów, Wołomin County in Masovian Voivodeship (east-central Poland)
Teodorów, Zwoleń County in Masovian Voivodeship (east-central Poland)
Teodorów, Greater Poland Voivodeship (west-central Poland)
Teodorów, Gmina Janów in Silesian Voivodeship (south Poland)
Teodorów, Gmina Koniecpol in Silesian Voivodeship (south Poland)